This is an incomplete list of Statutory Instruments of the United Kingdom in 1951. This listing is the complete, 30 items, "Partial dataset" as listed on www.legislation.gov.uk (as at March 2014).

Statutory Instruments

1-999
The Merchant Shipping (Registration of Sierra Leone Government Ships) Order 1951 SI 1951/143
The Trading with the Enemy (Custodian) Order 1951 SI 1951/153
The National Assistance (Adaptation of Enactments) Regulations 1950 1951 SI 1951/174
The Superannuation (English Local Government and Isle of Man) Interchange Rules 1951 SI 1951/309
The Coal Industry (Superannuation Scheme) (Winding Up, No. 2) Regulations 1951 SI 1951/393
The Airways Corporations (Pilots Pensions) Regulations 1951 SI 1951/527
The Veterinary Surgeons (University Degrees) (Glasgow) Order of Council 1951 SI 1951/571
The Trading with the Enemy (Custodian) (No. 2) Order 1951 SI 1951/779
The Trading with the Enemy (Custodian) (No. 3) Order 1951 SI 1951/780
The Conveyance of Explosives Byelaws 1951 SI 1951/869
The Prevention of Damage by Pests (Application to Shipping) Order 1951 SI 1951/967
The National Insurance and Industrial Injuries (Reciprocal Multilateral Agreement) (France and the Netherlands) Order 1951 SI 1951/972

1000-2224
The Cupro-Nickel Coins (Carriers' Liability) Regulations 1951 SI 1951/1032
The Consular Conventions (Kingdom of Norway) Order in Council 1951 SI 1951/1165
The Administration of Children’s Homes Regulations 1951 SI 1951/1217
The Workmen's Compensation Rules 1951 SI 1951/1235
The Reserve and Auxiliary Forces (Protection of Civil Interests) Rules 1951 SI 1951/1401
The Reserve and Auxiliary Forces (Protection of Civil Interests) (Business Premises) Regulations 1951 SI 1951/1402
The Reserve and Auxiliary Forces (Protection of Industrial Assurance &c. Policies) Regulations 1951 SI 1951/1407
The Reserve and Auxiliary Forces (Protection of Friendly Society Life Policies) Regulations 1951 SI 1951/1408
The Tithe Fees Rules 1951 SI 1951/1534
The Corn Rent Annuities (Apportionment and Redemption) Rules 1951 SI 1951/1535
The Trading with the Enemy (Custodian) (No. 4) Order 1951 SI 1951/1625
The Trading with the Enemy (Custodian) no(No. 5) Order 1951 SI 1951/1626
The National Insurance and Industrial Injuries (Reciprocal Multilateral Agreement) (Belgium) Order 1951 SI 1951/1801
The Hill Farming Improvements (Settled Land and Trusts for Sale) Regulations 1951 SI 1951/1816
The Distribution of German Enemy Property (No. 2) Order 1951 SI 1951/1899
The Coal Industry (Superannuation Scheme) (Winding Up, No. 3) Regulations 1951 SI 1951/2010
The Superannuation (Local Government Staffs) (National Service) (Amendment) Rules 1951 SI 1951/2145
The Town and Country Planning (Construction and Improvement of Private Streets) Regulations 1951 SI 1951/2224

Unreferenced Listings
The following 3 items were previously listed on this article, however are unreferenced on the authorities site, included here for a "no loss" approach.
Luxembourg (Extradition) Order in Council 1951 SI 1951/1170 
Hydrogen Cyanide (Fumigation of Buildings) Regulations 1951 SI 1951/1759 
Hydrogen Cyanide (Fumigation of Ships) Regulations 1951 SI 1951/1760

See also
 List of Statutory Instruments of the United Kingdom

References

External links
Legislation.gov.uk delivered by the UK National Archive
UK SI's on legislation.gov.uk
UK Draft SI's on legislation.gov.uk

Lists of Statutory Instruments of the United Kingdom
Statutory Instruments